Kitu (also Romanized as Kītū, Kaītū, and Keytū; also known as Geytow and Gīto) is a village in Gol Tappeh Rural District, Gol Tappeh District, Kabudarahang County, Hamadan Province, Iran. At the 2006 census, its population was 313, in 79 families.

References 

Populated places in Kabudarahang County